Jim George is an American author. He has co-authored several works with his wife Elizabeth George. He is a two-time finalist for the Gold Medallion Book Award.

Early life
George was born in Columbus, Kansas on May 14, 1943, to Preston George and Lois Onesti.

George graduated from The University of Oklahoma in 1966 with a Bachelor of Pharmacy. He earned his Master of Divinity from Talbot School of Theology in the late 1970s. He received his Master of Theology from Talbot School of Theology in the early 1980s.

In 1966, Jim joined the United States Army Reserve as a Combat Medic private. He retired from the US Army Reserves as a major in medical service corps in 1999.
George also worked as a pharmacist in Westwood, Los Angeles at Wadsworth Veterans Affairs Hospital.

Publications
George released his first book, A Man After God's Own Heart, in 2002. For several of Jim's publications, he later wrote study guides and devotionals.

Works

Personal life
In 1965, Jim married Elizabeth White in Bartlesville, Oklahoma. The couple met while attending The University of Oklahoma. Elizabeth is an author, speaker, and woman's Bible teacher. They have two children.

References

External links
Jim George Homepage
Author Profile on Harvest House Website
Jim George Facebook

1943 births
Living people
Christian writers
American self-help writers
21st-century American businesspeople
21st-century American non-fiction writers
20th-century American non-fiction writers
Pentecostal writers
Christian novelists
University of Oklahoma alumni